Yakup Ramazan Zorlu (born 26 March 1991) is a French-born Turkish professional footballer who plays for TFF Third League club Hacettepe 1945 SK.

References

External links
Goal

1991 births
Footballers from Orléans
French people of Turkish descent
Living people
Turkish footballers
Association football midfielders
Kartalspor footballers
Darıca Gençlerbirliği footballers
VfB Lübeck players
Giresunspor footballers
Kayseri Erciyesspor footballers
İstanbulspor footballers
Kahramanmaraşspor footballers
Fethiyespor footballers
Pendikspor footballers
TFF First League players
Regionalliga players
TFF Second League players
Süper Lig players
TFF Third League players
Turkish expatriate footballers
Expatriate footballers in Germany
Turkish expatriate sportspeople in Germany